Frank Delgado may refer to:
Frank Delgado (Cuban songwriter) (born 1960), Cuban songwriter
Frank Delgado (American musician) (born 1970), American musician in the band Deftones
Frankie Delgado (born 1981), Mexican-American reality TV personality